Flemings Mayfair is a boutique hotel located in Mayfair, London.

History
In 1851, Robert Fleming owned and ran a lodging house at number 10 Half Moon Street (believed to have originated in 1730).  Robert Fleming started running what he called a 'private hotel' in 1855, at 9 & 10 Half Moon Street 

From 1855 to 1857, George Hudson, MP for Sunderland, owned apartments in the hotel. Hudson, famed as the 'Railway King', was a fraudster who had his downfall when he was discovered to have falsified railway company share prices. He stayed at Flemings when it was not possible for him to be arrested due to his appointment as MP 

In 1964, Agatha Christie published At Bertram's Hotel, about an up-market hotel which serves as a front for organised crime. Christie's official biography claims Flemings as the model for the eponymous hotel, based on correspondence between Christie and her literary agent Edmund Cork.

7, 8 and 9-12 Half Moon Street were originally Georgian townhouses and have been listed Grade II on the National Heritage List for England since March 1980. The rear of the hotel at 39-42 Clarges Street, is also listed Grade II.

Restaurants and other facilities
Ormer Mayfair is under the direction of Executive Chef Sofian Msetfi. Ormer Mayfair was awarded four AA Rosettes in September 2022; has been featured in the Michelin Guide 2022 and voted one of the top five restaurants in London by the Harden's Restaurant Guide.

References

External links

1851 establishments in England
1851 in London
Grade II listed buildings in the City of Westminster
Hotels in London
Mayfair